A total of at least five special routes of U.S. Route 4 (US 4) have existed.

Fair Haven–West Rutland alternate route

Rutland business loop

U.S. Route 4 Business (US 4 Bus.) is a  alternate route of US 4 serving the city of Rutland, Vermont, and running north of US 4. It begins at exit 6 of the US 4 expressway in West Rutland and heads north to Main Street in West Rutland center, where it meets the east end of Vermont Route 4A (VT 4A). US 4 Bus. turns east, following Main Street into the town of Rutland. In the town of Rutland, the road changes names to Rutland Road and intersects with VT 3 at the town center. About  later, the road enters the city of Rutland, becoming West Street. US 4 Bus. briefly shifts north one block to use State Street before returning to West Street after half a mile. The route ends at an intersection with US 4 and US 7 in the center of the city.

Andover–Boscawen alternate route

Concord bypass route

East Northwood–Dover alternate route

See also

References

External links

04
04
04
U.S. Route 4